This is a list of Škoda Auto engines.

OHV (1964–2003) 
Škoda OHV is family of aluminium-block OHV engines developed by Škoda in 1964 for 1000MB and with various modifications manufactured for range of models until 2003. All versions were four-cylinders with aluminium block, three-bearing crankshaft and wet liners, which were made in various bores to allow variety of displacements. Until 1987, all engines used iron cast five port cylinder head, after that year, 135 and 136 versions for Škoda  and all subsequent variants used Aluminium eight  port head.

Iron-cast head engines

988 cc (1964-1977) 
bore 68mm, stroke 68mm, compression ratio 8,3:1, 
32 kW/4650RPM, toque 68 Nm/3000RPM

Used in:
Škoda 1000 MB (1964–1969)
Škoda 100 (1969–1976)

1107 cc (1967-1977) 
bore 72mm, stroke 68mm, compression ratio 9,5:1,
38 kW/4800RPM, torque 83 Nm/3000RPM

Used in:
Škoda 1100 MB (1967–1969)
Škoda 1100 MBX
Škoda 110 (1969–1976)
Škoda 110R Coupé (1970–1980)

Škoda 742.10 - 1046 cc (1976-1989) 
bore 68mm, stroke 72mm

Used in:
Škoda 105 (1976–1989)

Škoda 742.12 - 1174 cc (1976-1990) 
bore 72mm, stroke 72mm

Used in:
Škoda 120 (1976–1990)
Škoda 125 (1988–1990)

Škoda 742.12x - 1174 cc (1977-1986) 
More powerful variant of 742.12 engine

bore 72mm, stroke 72mm, compression ratio 9,5:1
40,5 kW/5200RPM, torque 85,5Nm/3250RPM

Used in:
Škoda 120 LS/GLS (1977–1987)
Škoda Garde/Rapid 120 (1982-1986)

Škoda 742-13 - 1289 cc (1984-1988) 
bore 75,5mm, stroke 72mm, compression ratio 9,5:1
43 kW/5000RPM, toque 97Nm/2800RPM

Used in:
Škoda 130 (1984–1988)
Škoda Rapid 130 (1984-1988)

Aluminium head engines 
For 1987 , Škoda has made major modifications to 130 engine to meet new emission standards. New engine had bimetallic pistons to lower oil consumption and new 8-port cylinder head, which improved power output and allowed engine to run on unleaded fuel. To fit new cylinder head, engine block had to be modified. In 1993, engine was available with Bosch single-point injection system with catalytic converter. In 1996 engine was further modified to meet EURO2 emission standard, modifications included multipoint injection system, larger camshaft bearings and larger intake/exhaust valves, which further improved power output and efficiency of engine.

In 1999 engine received last major modification. Engine block was reinforced and modified to fit larger 78mm crankshaft, valvetrain and lubrication system was modified to fit hydraulic tappets. As there was no need for distributor (MPI used ignition module mounted to cylinder head), valvetrain cover (in previous engines unchanged since 1964) could be made narrower, moving accessory belt closer to engine, so engine could be fitted to VW Lupo. Injection system was upgraded, now using two lambda probes and drive-by-wire throttle valve.
These modifications allowed to meet Euro 4 emission standards, before production ended in 2003

997 cc (1999-2001) 
bore 72mm, stroke 61,2mm
Škoda Fabia
VW Lupo
Seat Arosa

1289 cc (1987-2003) 
bore 75,5mm, stroke 72mm
Škoda 135/136 sedan (1987–1990)
Škoda Rapid 135/136 (1987–1990)
Škoda  (1987–1995)
Škoda Felicia (1994–2000)

1397 cc (2000-2003) 
bore 75,5mm, stroke 78mm
Škoda Fabia (2000–2003)
Škoda Octavia (1999–2001)

See also 
Škoda Auto
List of Volkswagen Group engines

External links 
Skoda-Auto.com - official website

Engines
Lists of automobile engines

Engines by maker